Unión Deportiva Almería (English: Almería Sports Union), often referred to as just Almería, is a professional football club, based in Almería, Andalusia, Spain.

Founded in 1989 under the name of Almería Club de Fútbol, changed its name to the current one in 2001.

Honours

UD Almería's only major trophy was the Segunda División title in the 2021–22 campaign. The club's precessor (AD Almería) also won the Segunda División in 1978–79, and won a Segunda División B trophy in the previous season.

Regional titles

 Trofeo Benéfico UCAM:

 Winners (1):
2014 – (2–1 UCAM Murcia)

 Trofeo Festa d'Elx:

 Winners (2):
2012 – (3–1 Elche)
2015 – (1–0 Elche)

 Trofeo Memorial Juan Rojas:

 Winners (7):
2001 – (2–1 Alicante)
2002 – (1–1 (5–4 p.) Villarreal)
2003 – (5–0 Málaga)
2005 – (2–0 Nacional )
2008 – (3–1 Betis)
2010 – (2–0 Granada)
2011 – (0–0 (3–1 p.) Villarreal)

 Trofeo Agroponiente:

 Winners (1):
2011 – (3–0 Comarca de Níjar)

 Trofeo Carabela de Plata:

 Winners (1):
2011 – (2–1 Cartagena)

 Trofeo Lagarto de Jaén:

 Winners (1):
2009 – (2–0 Jaén)

 Trofeo Vendimia:

 Winners (1):
2007 – (1–0 Xerez)

 Trofeo Alcalde de Águilas:

 Winners (1):
2007

 Trofeo Villa de Nerja:

 Winners (1):
2007 – (3–2 Málaga)

 Trofeo Costa Brava:

 Winners (1):
2007

 Trofeo Ciudad de Terrassa:

 Winners (1):
2007

National titles
 Segunda División:

 Winners (1): 2021–22
 Runners-up (1): 2006–07

 Segunda División B:

 Runners-up (2): 1994–95, 2001–02

 Tercera División:

 Runners-up (1): 1992–93

Statistics

Seasons in La Liga: 6
Best position in La Liga: 8th (2007–08)
Points obtained: 52
Worst position in La Liga: 20th (2010–11)
Seasons in Segunda División: 13
Best position in Segunda División: 1st (2021–22)
Points obtained: 81
Worst position in Segunda División: 18th (2002–03, 2015–16, 2017–18)
Most goals scored in a season: 88 (1992–93)
Most goals scored in a La Liga match: 
Home:Almería 3 – Villarreal 0 (4 April 2009), Almería 3 – Mallorca 1 (15 May 2011), Almería 3 – Granada 0 (4 January 2014), Almería 3 – Granada 0 (11 April 2015)
Away:Sevilla 1 – Almería 4 (19 April 2008)
Most goals conceded in a La Liga match:
Home: Almería 0 – Barcelona 8 (20 November 2010)
Away: Real Madrid 8 – Almería 1 (21 May 2011)

Overall seasons table in La Liga

{|class="wikitable"
|-bgcolor="#efefef"
!  Pos.
! Club  
! Season In D1
! Pl.
! W
! D
! L
! GS
! GA
! Dif.
! Pts
!Champion
!2nd place
!3rd place
!4th place
|-
|align=center|38
|Almería
|align=center|6
|align=center|228
|align=center|62
|align=center|56
|align=center|110
|align=center|244
|align=center|366
|align=center|-122
|align=center|242
| align=center bgcolor=gold| 0
| align=center bgcolor=silver| 0
| align=center bgcolor=bronze| 0
| align=center | 0
|}

Last updated: 19 August 2015

Pos. = Position; Pl = Match played; W = Win; D = Draw; L = Lost; GS = Goals scored; GA = Goals against; P = Points.
Colors: Gold = winner; Silver = runner-up.

Milestones
Players in bold are still playing for the club.

All-time top scorer: Raúl Sánchez with 57 goals (1997–99, 2000–02)
Most appearances: José Ortiz Bernal with 338 matches (1997–2012)
Youngest player to debut: Gaspar Panadero, with 16 years and 277 days (against Córdoba CF on 12 September 2014)
Youngest player to score: Hicham Khaloua, with 18 years and 341 days (against Real Sociedad on 24 March 2014)
Manager with most matches in charge: Francisco, with 46 (June 2013–December 2014)

Most appearances and goals
1

{| class="wikitable" style="text-align:center;"
|-
!
!width="120"|Player Name
!width="40"|
!width="40"|
|-
!1
|align="left"|Raúl Sánchez
|
|57
|-
!2
|align="left"|Leonardo Ulloa
|
|48
|-
!3
|align="left"|José Ortiz
|
|47
|-
!4
|align="left"|Soriano
|
|46
|-
!rowspan="2"|5
|align="left"|Kalu Uche
|
|45
|-
|align="left"|Francisco
|
|45
|-
!7
|align="left"|Luna
|
|39
|-
!rowspan="2"|8
|align="left"|Albert Crusat
|
|34
|-
|align="left"|Manuel Sousa
|
|34
|-
!rowspan="2"|10
|align="left"|Álvaro Negredo
|
|32
|-
|align="left"|Charles
|
|32

1 According to BDFutbol.

Milestone goals in La Liga

See also

 UD Almería seasons

Footnotes

References

External links
 

Statistics
Almeria
Records